John Jacob Quinn (April 1, 1908 – September 20, 1976) was an American executive in Major League Baseball. His career spanned over 40 years and included almost 28 full seasons as a general manager in the National League for the Boston / Milwaukee Braves and Philadelphia Phillies. He produced three National League pennants and one World Series championship during his 1945–58 tenure with the Braves.

Quinn was a member of one of the game's most prominent multi-generational families. During the era between the end of World War I and the end of World War II, his father, J. A. Robert Quinn, held various senior management and ownership positions in baseball: business manager of the St. Louis Browns, general manager of the Brooklyn Dodgers, and owner/general manager of both the Boston Red Sox and Boston Braves. John J. Quinn's son, son-in-law and grandson have also been senior baseball executives.

Quinn was born in Columbus, Ohio, during the period when his father was the president and business manager of the minor league Columbus Senators.

General manager of Braves and Phillies

Boston/Milwaukee Braves (1945–58)
A graduate of Boston College, Quinn worked with his father in the Red Sox front office, then rejoined J. A. Robert Quinn with Boston's National League franchise from 1936–45, serving as club treasurer and, later, farm system director.  He succeeded his father as the Braves' general manager in 1945, working under the club's new ownership group headed by Lou Perini. He served in the GM post through the 1958 season, from the Braves' final seven years in Boston through their highly successful first six years as the Milwaukee Braves, winning the 1948 National League pennant in Boston, and the 1957 World Series and 1958 NL title in Milwaukee.

Quinn's 1948 Boston team was anchored by starting pitchers Johnny Sain and Warren Spahn. Sain was acquired by the elder Quinn in a minor league transaction in 1942, and Spahn (a future Hall of Famer and baseball's winningest-all-time left-handed pitcher) came up through John Quinn's farm system. Tommy Holmes, the club's star right fielder, had been obtained from the New York Yankees in a December 1941 trade; he was the runner-up in 's National League Most Valuable Player balloting. However, the younger Quinn was instrumental in building the 1948 Braves. Quinn acquired so many supporting pieces from the perennially contending St. Louis Cardinals that his postwar Braves were often called the "Cape Cod Cardinals."

Quinn also broke the baseball color line in Boston by purchasing the contract of fleet center fielder Sam Jethroe from the Dodgers; as a first-year player with the  Braves, Jethroe was selected the National League's Rookie of the Year. Under Quinn, the Braves became the fifth of the then-16 Major League teams to integrate, and the third in the National League.

His Milwaukee champions of the 1950s relied heavily on the Braves' productive farm system, which developed Hall of Famers Eddie Mathews and Henry Aaron, All-Star catcher Del Crandall, shortstop Johnny Logan, starting pitcher Bob Buhl and starting outfielders Wes Covington and Bill Bruton, among many others. Quinn also acquired three key contributors via trades: Lew Burdette, the Braves' ace right-handed starting pitcher, who came from the Yankees as a rookie in a late-season  transaction for Sain; slugging first baseman Joe Adcock, obtained from the Cincinnati Redlegs in a four-team trade just before spring training in 1953; and  veteran second baseman Red Schoendienst, another future Hall of Famer, who was the centerpiece of a major midseason 1957 deal with the New York Giants. The Milwaukee Braves' home attendance shattered National League records during Quinn's tenure, never dipping below 1.749 million fans and exceeding the two-million mark for four straight years (1954–57).

Philadelphia Phillies (1959–1972)
Quinn left the Braves, the defending National League champion, in January 1959 to take the reins of the cellar-dwelling Philadelphia Phillies as general manager. Within five years, Quinn rebuilt the Phillies into contenders.

Led by players Quinn signed or acquired via trades—pitcher (and future Baseball Hall of Famer) Jim Bunning, infielders Dick Allen, Cookie Rojas and Tony Taylor, outfielders Johnny Callison, Tony González and ex-Brave Covington, and catcher Clay Dalrymple, among others—his 1964 Phillies were on the verge of winning the club's third pennant in its long history. But they suffered a nightmarish ten-game losing streak in late September to fall out of the league lead and finish second.  Quinn then was faced with a second rebuilding job during the late 1960s.  In his final trade, he acquired another future Hall of Fame pitcher, Steve Carlton, from the Cardinals on February 25, 1972.  However, the Phillies' continued struggles on the field during the  season led to Quinn's replacement as GM by Paul Owens, the club's farm system and scouting director, on June 3.

Family
Quinn represented the second generation in his family's four-generation participation in baseball management. His son Bob was a longtime executive in the game who served as general manager of the Yankees, Cincinnati Reds and San Francisco Giants; another son, Jack, was the owner and general manager of the Hawaii Islanders of the Triple-A Pacific Coast League and also served as GM of the St. Louis Blues franchise in the National Hockey League. His daughter Margo married longtime baseball executive Roland Hemond. His granddaughter, Kay Quinn, is currently an anchor for KSDK in St. Louis. And a grandson, also named Bob, is the former executive vice president, finance and administration, of the Milwaukee Brewers.

John J. Quinn briefly scouted for the Houston Astros after he left Philadelphia. He died at age 68 in Stanton, California, on September 20, 1976.

References

External links
You Could Look it Up: John Quinn’s Reign at Baseball Prospectus
John Quinn at SABR (Baseball BioProject)

1908 births
1976 deaths
Boston Braves executives
Boston College alumni
Businesspeople from Columbus, Ohio
Houston Astros scouts
Major League Baseball executives
Major League Baseball general managers
Milwaukee Braves executives
Philadelphia Phillies executives
20th-century American businesspeople